Stephen Hilger (born in Los Angeles, California) is an American photographer, writer, and educator who lives in Brooklyn, New York.

Career 
Hilger received his BA and MFA degrees from Columbia University in 1998 and 2003. He participated in the Whitney Museum of American Art’s Independent Study Program in 2003-2004.

Hilger’s photographs trace historical narratives visible in American cities.  Beginning in 2001, his photographs focused on visual motifs at the intersection of public and private spaces throughout LA. From 2004 to its razing in 2006, Hilger documented the Ambassador Hotel, the site of the assassination of Robert F. Kennedy in 1968.  During 2008-2012, Hilger lived in New Orleans, LA during which time he photographed the Back of Town, a historic district devastated during Hurricane Katrina, partially rebuilt then marked for demolition.  Hilger’s book of photographs, entitled Back of Town, depicts the neighborhood during its last days. Hilger has said of his working approach, “I don’t think of documentary photography as being about truth, but rather viewing and experiencing the world.” 

Hilger teaches at Pratt Institute in Brooklyn, NY where he is an Associate Professor and previously was Photography Chair.  Previously, Hilger taught at Tulane University in New Orleans, LA; and at Columbia University, New York University Steinhardt School, and Pace University, all in New York, NY.   Hilger writes about photography, photography books, and contemporary art for periodicals including Aperture and BOMB.   He has written critical essays for books about artists including Sue de Beer and Lee Friedlander.

Collections 

Hilger’s photographs are included in the permanent collections of the Los Angeles County Museum of Art and New Orleans Museum of Art.

Publications

Photography books 

 Hilger, Stephen; Back of Town. Brooklyn, NY: SPQR Editions, 2016. 

 Hilger, Stephen; BLVD. Brooklyn, NY: Roman Nvmerals, 2017.

Other publications 

 Sue de Beer, Hans und Grete, Essays by Alissa Bennett, Dennis Cooper,  Stephen Hilger. Künstlerhaus Bethanien, Berlin, Philip Morris GmbH, Munich, American Academy in Berlin, 2002. ISBN 978-3932754326

 Lee Friedlander: The Printed Picture. Edited with essays by Stephen Hilger and Peter Kayafas. Eakins Press Foundation and  Pratt Institute Photography Department and Libraries, 2014. OCLC 898196377

References 

Year of birth missing (living people)
Living people
American photographers
Photographers from Los Angeles
Fine art photographers
Columbia University School of the Arts alumni
21st-century American photographers